Siemowit III of Masovia (alternatively Ziemowit III;  – 1381) was a prince of Masovia and a co-regent (with his brother Casimir I of Warsaw) of the lands of Warsaw, Czersk, Rawa, Gostynin and other parts of Masovia.

Life 
Siemowit was the second son of Trojden I of Masovia and his wife Maria, daughter of Yuri I of Galicia.

In 1341, following the death of their father and brother, Siemowit and his younger brother Casimir inherited the Duchy of Czersk. In 1345 following the death of their uncle Siemowit II of Rawa, they also inherited the Duchy of Rawa. In 1349 the two brothers shared their possessions. Siemowit gave the small region of Warsaw to his brother Casimir, retaining the regions of Czersk, Liw and Rawa.

Early in his reign, Siemowit tried to establish good neighborly relations with his powerful neighbors: the Teutonic Order, Poland and Bohemia. Some historians believe that Siemowit rendered a tribute of vassalage to Charles IV, Holy Roman Emperor in 1346. Other historians say this happened in 1351, in order to inherit from Boleslaw III of Płock who was a vassal of Bohemia.

But on September 18, 1351, Siemowit and Casimir recognised the Polish King Casimir III the Great as suzerain, canceling the allegiance of Masovia and Bohemia. In exchange, they got Gostynin (Siemowit) and Sochaczew (Casimir), former possessions of Boleslaw III. Casimir also gave the Duchy of Płock to the brothers.

When his brother Casimir died unexpectedly in 1355, Casimir III the Great left the Duchy of Warsaw to Siemowit. In exchange, he promised never to ally with enemies of Poland and the Duchy of Płock would return to Poland, unless Casimir III died without an heir. In addition, Casimir III offered Siemowit a small territory of Lesser Poland bounded by the river Pilica and Radomka.

From that time, relations between Siemowit and Casimir III the Great become increasingly narrow. In 1363, Siemowit was invited to Krakow for the marriage of Elizabeth of Pomerania, granddaughter of the king of Poland, with the Emperor Charles IV. In September 1364 he participated in a conference in Krakow, which offered five crowned kings, dukes and princes extravagant festivities and tournaments. In 1369 Margaret, the daughter of Siemowit, wife of Casimir IV, Duke of Pomerania, adopted an illegitimate son of Casimir III the Great. At that time, Casimir IV of Słupsk was one of the contenders to succeed Casimir III the Great, who left only daughters.

When Casimir III the Great died in 1370, under agreements concluded with one of his lifetime friends Siemowit III, he freed Siemowit from Polish suzerainty and gave Płock, Wizna, Wyszogród and Zakroczym back to Mazovia. Having a reunified Masovia, it regained its independence, there Siemowit III promulgates a customary law in 1377. He reformed the administration, justice and the monetary system.

In 1373/1374 he gave the regions of Warsaw and Rawa to his sons, Siemowit IV of Masovia and Janusz I of Warsaw.

Marriages and Issue 
In 1335, Siemowit married Euphemia, daughter of Nicholas II of Opava. They had the following children:
Euphemia (-21 June 1418/9 December 1424), married Władysław Opolczyk.
Anna (before 1345-after 16 Mar 1403), nun at Ratibor.
Janusz I of Warsaw (-8 Dec 1429), succeeded in 1374 as Janusz I, Prince of Ciechanów and Warsaw .
Margaret (before 1358-14 May 1388/4 April 1396), married firstly to Casimir IV, Duke of Pomerania and secondly to Henry VII of Brzeg.
Siemowit IV of Masovia (b. ca. 1353/1356- d. January 21, 1426), succeeded his father as Duke of Masovia.

Siemowit remarried, after Euphemia's death to Anna, daughter of Nicolas of Ziębice. From this marriage he had three children:
unnamed son (1361/1364 - died young before 14 Mar 1378).
unnamed son (1362/1365 - died young before 14 Mar 1378).
Henry of Masovia (1368/1370–1392/1393), became Bishop of Płock.

Siemowit accused Anna of adultery when she became pregnant with Henry. After his birth Siemowit had Anna strangled and Henry cast away. However, it turned out Henry was the son of Siemowit so he was made a bishop.

After working his whole life on reuniting Masovia and making it an independent state, Siemowit III died on June 16, 1381 and was buried at Plock Cathedral.

References 

1320 births
1381 deaths
Dukes of Masovia
Piast dynasty